Bhanwari Kaur (b. ? - d.1669)  was a woman from Brij region in Uttar Pradesh, India who struggled against the oppression by Mugal ruler Aurangzeb in 1669. She was the sister of Gokula Singh, a Jat chieftain of Tilpat.

References

Medieval India
History of Rajasthan
People from Rajasthan
Year of birth missing
Place of birth missing
Place of death missing
1669 deaths